Harry Hugasian (August 29, 1929 - September 3, 2016) was a former American football guard who played for the Chicago Bears and Baltimore Colts. He played college football at Stanford University, having previously attended South Milwaukee High School and Pasadena High School. He was of Armenian descent. Hugasian died on September 3, 2016, at the age of 87.

References

1929 births
2016 deaths
American football halfbacks
Stanford Cardinal football players
Chicago Bears players
Baltimore Colts players
Players of American football from Pasadena, California
Players of American football from Wisconsin
People from South Milwaukee, Wisconsin
Sportspeople from the Milwaukee metropolitan area
American people of Armenian descent
Pasadena High School (California) alumni